The Palazzo della Ragione Madonna is a fragment of a fresco of  by Bramantino, originally on the façade of the Palazzo della Ragione, Milan, and now in the Pinacoteca di Brera in the same city. Due to a reference by Giovanni Paolo Lomazzo it was long misattributed to Bramante, until it entered its present home  in 1808.

References

Paintings in the collection of the Pinacoteca di Brera
Paintings of the Madonna and Child
Angels in art
1510 paintings
Fresco paintings in Milan
Paintings by Bramantino